Riser (stylized as RISER) is the seventh studio album by American country music singer Dierks Bentley. It was released on February 25, 2014, by Capitol Nashville, and debuted at number 6 on the Billboard 200, becoming his seventh top ten album.  
The album was nominated for Best Country Album at the 57th Annual Grammy Awards.

Content
The album includes the singles "Bourbon in Kentucky", "I Hold On", "Drunk on a Plane", "Say You Do". and the title track Riser. The first single peaked at number 45 on the Country Airplay chart, becoming Bentley's lowest-charting single to date at the time. The album was originally scheduled to be released in late 2013. The label decided to postpone the album's release date, and quickly began promoting the album's second single "I Hold On", which reached number 1 on Country Airplay. "Drunk on a Plane", the album's third single, became one of the biggest hits of his career, peaking at number 27 on the Billboard Hot 100. "Say You Do" served as the album's fourth single.  The fifth single, also the title track, was released to radio on June 15, 2015.

Bentley told Roughstock that “You have one ear monitor in, one ear out, and the crowd’s there and your voice feels really great. There’s a certain amount of gravel to it because you’re tired, but you’re all jacked up on whatever you're drinking and adrenaline, and the crowds and the fans are there and there’s this feeling, fists in the air—it’s that thing that’s hard to transfer into a studio environment. There’s a rawness.”

Critical reception

Riser garnered positive reception from eight music critics ratings and reviews. At Metacritic, they assign a "weighted average" score to selected independent ratings and reviews, and based upon six reviews the album has a Metascore of 70, which means the album received "generally favorable" reviews. Brian Mansfield of USA Today rated the album a perfect four stars, writing that "Grief over his dad's death infuses Riser so deeply that the emotions his loss triggered seep even into songs about girls", and observes this in how "Bentley bares his soul in meditations on love and loss, death and rebirth." At AllMusic, Stephen Thomas Erlewine rated the album three-and-a-half stars out of five, saying that because of the big issues dealt with on the album "it's no wonder that Riser doesn't quite feel brimming with lighthearted singles, but it's a sturdy, often absorbing record from a singer who is determined to be in it for the long haul." Sarah Rodman of The Boston Globe gave a positive review, noting how Bentley has a career that he's built on the "bedrock concepts that feel more quaint all the time: musicianship, emotional integrity, and hard work", which just happens that "Those elements again make themselves known on his stirring seventh album".

At Country Weekly, Jon Freeman graded the album an A, stating that the album is "leaps and bounds" from his first song and shows how Bentley grew as an artist "incrementally, in a way that feels effortless and natural." Dan MacIntosh of Roughstock rated the album four-and-a-half stars out of five, noting how "The quality of his songs speak for themselves" on the album, which he declares Bentley has "never been better." Yet, MacIntosh writes that "Riser may pass the emotional balancing test, but it’s nevertheless a few rungs short of content perfection." At Got Country Online, Tara Toro rated the "ballad heavy" album four-and-a-half stars out of five, calling it "an unhurried record" that is "full of reflective, emotional and mature songs"; and "Throughout the record, one hears Dierks’s gravelly vocals, perhaps at the best they have been, pouring emotions into every song." Nashville Country Club's Lisa Coleman rated the album four stars out of five, alluding to how the release "features an excellent track listing of songs of both intense and light hearted nature."

However, Jon Caramanica of The New York Times gave a mixed review of the release, indicating this is a "hit-or-miss album."  At Rolling Stone, Andrew Dansby rated the album two-and-a-half stars out of five, noting that "Compared to what gets played on country radio, Dierks Bentley can almost sound like a traditionalist, with his hickory voice and songs about drinking"; however Bentley on Riser "devolves into a standard-issue world of bikinis and Bud Light."

In 2017, Billboard contributor Chuck Dauphin placed three tracks from the album on his top 10 list of Bentley's best songs: "I Hold On" at number one, "Drunk on a Plane" at number seven and "Bourbon in Kentucky" at number ten.

Commercial performance

Riser debuted at number 6 on the Billboard 200 selling 63,000 copies in its opening week, becoming his seventh top ten album. It also debuted at No. 1 on Billboard's Top Country Albums chart, his fifth No. 1 on the chart. The album has sold 380,000 copies in the U.S. as of April 2016.

Track listing

Personnel

Jessi Alexander – background vocals
Sam Ashworth – background vocals
Dierks Bentley – lead vocals
Ross Copperman – acoustic guitar, electric guitar, keyboards, mandolin, programming, background vocals
Dan Dugmore – dobro, acoustic guitar, electric guitar, pedal steel guitar
Fred Eltringham – drums, percussion
Kenny Greenberg – acoustic guitar, electric guitar
Rob Hajacos – fiddle
Lee Hendricks – bass guitar
Mark Hill – bass guitar 
Dan Hochhalter – banjo, fiddle
Jedd Hughes – electric guitar
Jaren Johnston – banjo, acoustic guitar, background vocals
Brian Layson – banjo, electric guitar, mandolin
Jason Lehning – Hammond B-3 organ, keyboards, synthesizer
Hillary Lindsey – background vocals
Tony Lucido – bass guitar
Kacey Musgraves – background vocals on "Bourbon in Kentucky"
Jon Randall – background vocals
Mickey Raphael – harmonica
F. Reid Shippen – percussion
Chris Stapleton – background vocals on "Hurt Somebody"
Bryan Sutton – acoustic guitar, mandolin
Ilya Toshinsky – banjo, acoustic guitar, electric guitar, mandolin
Ryan Tyndell – electric guitar, keyboards, mandolin, percussion, background vocals
Charlie Worsham – electric guitar, keyboards, mandolin, percussion, background vocals
Craig Wright – drums, percussion
Jonathan Yudkin – string arrangements, strings

Charts

Weekly charts

Year-end charts

Singles

Certifications

References

2014 albums 
Albums produced by Ross Copperman
Capitol Records Nashville albums
Dierks Bentley albums